Bedřich Hrozný (6 May 1879 – 12 December 1952), also known as , was a Czech orientalist and linguist. He contributed to the decipherment of the ancient Hittite language, identified it as an Indo-European language, and laid the groundwork for the development of Hittitology.

Biography
Hrozný was born in Lysá nad Labem, Bohemia, Austria-Hungary. In the town of Kolín he learned Hebrew and Arabic. At the University of Vienna, he studied Akkadian, Aramaic, Ethiopian, Sumerian and Sanskrit, as well as the cuneiform used in Asia Minor, Mesopotamia and Persia. He also studied orientalism at Humboldt University of Berlin.

Career
In 1905, following excavations in Palestine, he became professor at the University of Vienna.

In 1906, at Hattusa (modern Boğazkale, about 200 km east of Ankara) a German expedition found the archives of the Hittite kings in cuneiform, but in an unknown language. While on active duty in the Austro-Hungarian army during World War I, Hrozný published in 1917 a description of the language showing that it belonged to the Indo-European family.

In 1925 Hrozný led a Czechoslovak archaeological team that discovered 1000 cuneiform tablets containing contracts and letters of Assyrian merchants in the Turkish village of Kültepe, and excavated the nearby ancient Hittite city of Kanesh.

In 1929, Hrozný founded Archiv Orientální, which became one of the leading journals for Oriental Studies.  

Later in his life, he tried to decipher the hieroglyphic script used by the Hittites and scripts used in ancient India and Crete, but failed in his effort. From 1919 to 1952, he was a Professor of cuneiform research and ancient Oriental history at the Charles University in Prague. After the German occupation of Czechoslovakia he was made rector of the Charles University, holding that post in 19391940 (all Czech universities were closed by Germans then). In that capacity, he helped some students escape arrest during an incident in 1939, stating to the German officer in charge that the Germans had no legal right to pursue students on the independent university's territory. A stroke in 1944 ended his scientific work.

Deciphering of the Hittite language 

To solve the mystery about the Hittite language, Bedřich Hrozný used two sentences that appeared in a text that reads: nu NINDA-an ezzatteni watar-ma ekutteni. It was known at that time that the ideogram for NINDA meant bread in Sumerian. Hrozný thought that the suffix -an was perhaps the Hittite accusative. Then, he assumed that the second word, ed-/-ezza, had something to do with the bread and assumed that it could be the verb to eat. The comparison with the Latin edo, the English eat and the German essen led to the assumption that NINDA-an ezzatteni means "you will eat bread". In the second sentence, Hrozný was struck by the word watar that has similarities to the English water and German Wasser. The last word of the second sentence, ekutteni, had the stem eku-, which seemed to resemble the Latin aqua (water). So, he translated the second sentence as "you will drink water". Hrozný soon realized that the Hittites were speaking an Indo-European language, making it much easier to decipher and read their cuneiform tablets.  Using these insights, Hrozný continued his work and was able to publish the Hittite grammar in 1917.

Publications
 Sumerisch-babylonische Mythen von dem Gotte Ninrag (Ninib). Berlin: Wolf Peiser, 1903.
 Obilí ve staré Babylónii. (= “Wheat in Ancient Babylonian”). Vienna: Hölder in Kommission, 1913.
 “Die Lösung des hethitischen Problems”, Mitteilungen der Deutschen Orient-Gesellschaft 56 (1915): 17–50.
 Die Sprache der Hethiter, ihr Bau und ihre Zugehörigkeit zum indogermanischen Sprachstamm. Leipzig: J.C. Hinrichs, 1917 (reprint: Dresden: TU Dresden, 2002).
 Hethitische Keilschrifttexte aus Boghazköi, in Umschrift, mit Übersetzung und Kommentar. Leipzig: J.C. Hinrichs, 1919.
 Über die Völker und Sprachen des alten Chatti-Landes: Hethitische Könige. Leipzig: J.C. Hinrichs, 1920.
 Keilschrifttexte aus Boghazköi, vol. 5 (of 6): Autographien. Leipzig: J.C. Hinrichs, 1921 (reprint: Osnabrück: Zeller, 1970).
 Les inscriptions hittites hiéroglyphiques: Essai de déchiffrement, suivi d’une grammaire hittite hiéroglyphique en paradigmes et d’une liste d’hiéroglyphes. Prague: Orientální Ústav, 1933.
 Über die älteste Völkerwanderung und über das Problem der proto-indischen Zivilisation: Ein Versuch, die proto-indischen Inschriften von Mohendscho-Daro zu entziffern. Prague, 1939.
 Die älteste Geschichte Vorderasiens und Indiens. Prague: Melantrich, 1940, 1941, 1943.
 Inscriptions cunéiformes du Kultépé, vol. 1. Prague, 1952.
 Ancient history of Western Asia, India and Crete. New York, 1953.

Literature
 Šárka Velhartická: Bedřich Hrozný a 100 let chetitologie / Bedřich Hrozný and 100 Years of Hittitology. Praha (Národní galerie), 2015.
 Šárka Velhartická: Bedřich Hrozný: Texty a přednášky. Archeologické expedice a lingvistické objevy předního českého orientalisty, Praha / Hradec Králové (Academia / Univerzita Hradec Králové), 2022.
 Šárka Velhartická: Dopisy Bedřicha Hrozného literárním osobnostem, Praha (Památník národního písemnictví), 2015.
 Šárka Velhartická: Justin Václav Prášek a Bedřich Hrozný. Počátky české staroorientalistiky a klínopisného bádání, Praha / Hradec Králové (Academia / Univerzita Hradec Králové), 2019.

References 

1879 births
1952 deaths
Academic staff of the University of Vienna
Austro-Hungarian military personnel of World War I
Czech archaeologists
Czech orientalists
Czech philologists
Hittitologists
Humboldt University of Berlin alumni
Linguists from the Czech Republic
People from Lysá nad Labem
Rectors of Charles University
University of Vienna alumni